Crace may refer to:

People
 Edward Kendall Crace (1844–1892), Australian pastoralist
 Sir John Gregory Crace, KBE, CB (1887–1968), officer in Royal Navy and Royal Australian Navy
 Jim Crace (born 1946), English writer
 John Crace (writer) (born 1956), British journalist and critic
 Lauren Crace (born 1986), English actress

English interior designers
 Edward Crace (1725–1799), English interior designer and Keeper of the King's Pictures
 John Crace (designer) (1754–1819), eldest son of Edward Crace, English interior designer
 Frederick Crace (1779–1859), English interior decorator and collector of maps and prints, eldest son of John Crace
 John Gregory Crace (designer) (1809–1889), English interior designer and author, elder surviving son of Frederick Crace
 John Dibblee Crace (1838–1919), English interior designer and author, eldest son of John Gregory Crace

Places
 Crace, Australian Capital Territory, an established suburb of Canberra, Australia